Algebra is the study of variables and the rules for manipulating these variables in formulas; it is a unifying thread of almost all of mathematics.

Elementary algebra deals with the manipulation of variables (commonly represented by Roman letters) as if they were numbers and is therefore essential in all applications of mathematics. Abstract algebra is the name given, mostly in education, to the study of algebraic structures such as groups, rings, and fields. Linear algebra, which deals with linear equations and linear mappings, is used for modern presentations of geometry, and has many practical applications (in weather forecasting, for example). There are many areas of mathematics that belong to algebra, some having "algebra" in their name, such as commutative algebra, and some not, such as Galois theory.

The word algebra is not only used for naming an area of mathematics and some subareas; it is also used for naming some sorts of algebraic structures, such as an algebra over a field, commonly called an algebra. Sometimes, the same phrase is used for a subarea and its main algebraic structures; for example, Boolean algebra and a Boolean algebra. A mathematician specialized in algebra is called an algebraist.

Etymology 

In his work, the term al-jabr referred to the operation of moving a term from one side of an equation to the other, المقابلة al-muqābala "balancing" referred to adding equal terms to both sides. Shortened to just algeber or algebra in Latin, the word eventually entered the English language during the 15th century, from either Spanish, Italian, or Medieval Latin. It originally referred to the surgical procedure of setting broken or dislocated bones. The mathematical meaning was first recorded (in English) in the 16th century.

Different meanings of "algebra" 
The word "algebra" has several related meanings in mathematics, as a single word or with qualifiers.
 As a single word without an article, "algebra" names a broad part of mathematics.
 As a single word with an article or in the plural, "an algebra" or "algebras" denotes a specific mathematical structure, whose precise definition depends on the context. Usually, the structure has an addition, multiplication, and scalar multiplication (see Algebra over a field). When some authors use the term "algebra", they make a subset of the following additional assumptions: associative, commutative, unital, and/or finite-dimensional. In universal algebra, the word "algebra" refers to a generalization of the above concept, which allows for n-ary operations.
 With a qualifier, there is the same distinction:
 Without an article, it means a part of algebra, such as linear algebra, elementary algebra (the symbol-manipulation rules taught in elementary courses of mathematics as part of primary and secondary education), or abstract algebra (the study of the algebraic structures for themselves).
 With an article, it means an instance of some algebraic structure, like a Lie algebra, an associative algebra, or a vertex operator algebra.
 Sometimes both meanings exist for the same qualifier, as in the sentence: Commutative algebra is the study of commutative rings, which are commutative algebras over the integers.

Algebra as a branch of mathematics 

Algebra began with computations similar to those of arithmetic, with letters standing for numbers. This allowed proofs of properties that are true no matter which numbers are involved. For example, in the quadratic equation

 can be any numbers whatsoever (except that  cannot be ), and the quadratic formula can be used to quickly and easily find the values of the unknown quantity  which satisfy the equation. That is to say, to find all the solutions of the equation.

Historically, and in current teaching, the study of algebra starts with the solving of equations, such as the quadratic equation above. Then more general questions, such as "does an equation have a solution?", "how many solutions does an equation have?", "what can be said about the nature of the solutions?" are considered. These questions led extending algebra to non-numerical objects, such as permutations, vectors, matrices, and polynomials. The structural properties of these non-numerical objects were then formalized into algebraic structures such as groups, rings, and fields.

Before the 16th century, mathematics was divided into only two subfields, arithmetic and geometry. Even though some methods, which had been developed much earlier, may be considered nowadays as algebra, the emergence of algebra and, soon thereafter, of infinitesimal calculus as subfields of mathematics only dates from the 16th or 17th century. From the second half of the 19th century on, many new fields of mathematics appeared, most of which made use of both arithmetic and geometry, and almost all of which used algebra.

Today, algebra has grown considerably and includes many branches of mathematics, as can be seen in the Mathematics Subject Classification
where none of the first level areas (two digit entries) are called algebra. Today algebra includes section 08-General algebraic systems, 12-Field theory and polynomials, 13-Commutative algebra, 15-Linear and multilinear algebra; matrix theory, 16-Associative rings and algebras, 17-Nonassociative rings and algebras, 18-Category theory; homological algebra, 19-K-theory and 20-Group theory. Algebra is also used extensively in 11-Number theory and 14-Algebraic geometry.

History 

The use of the word "algebra" for denoting a part of mathematics dates probably from the 16th century. The word is derived from the Arabic word al-jabr that appears in the title of the treatise Al-Kitab al-muhtasar fi hisab al-gabr wa-l-muqabala (The Compendious Book on Calculation by Completion and Balancing), written circa 820 by Al-Kwarizmi.

Al-jabr referred to a method for transforming equations by subtracting like terms from both sides, or passing one term from one side to the other, after changing its sign.

Therefore, algebra referred originally to the manipulation of equations, and, by extension, to the theory of equations. This is still what historians of mathematics generally mean by algebra.

In mathematics, the meaning of algebra has evolved after the introduction by François Viète of symbols (variables) for denoting unknown or incompletely specified numbers, and the resulting use of the mathematical notation for equations and formulas. So, algebra became essentially the study of the action of operations on expressions involving variables. This includes but is not limited to the theory of equations.

At the beginning of the 20th century, algebra evolved further by considering operations that act not only on numbers but also on elements of so-called mathematical structures such as groups, fields and vector spaces. This new algebra was called modern algebra by van der Waerden in his eponymous treatise, whose name has been changed to Algebra in later editions.

Early history 

The roots of algebra can be traced to the ancient Babylonians, who developed an advanced arithmetical system with which they were able to do calculations in an algorithmic fashion. The Babylonians developed formulas to calculate solutions for problems typically solved today by using linear equations, quadratic equations, and indeterminate linear equations. By contrast, most Egyptians of this era, as well as Greek and Chinese mathematics in the 1st millennium BC, usually solved such equations by geometric methods, such as those described in the Rhind Mathematical Papyrus, Euclid's Elements, and The Nine Chapters on the Mathematical Art. The geometric work of the Greeks, typified in the Elements, provided the framework for generalizing formulae beyond the solution of particular problems into more general systems of stating and solving equations, although this would not be realized until mathematics developed in medieval Islam.

By the time of Plato, Greek mathematics had undergone a drastic change. The Greeks created a geometric algebra where terms were represented by sides of geometric objects, usually lines, that had letters associated with them. Diophantus (3rd century AD) was an Alexandrian Greek mathematician and the author of a series of books called Arithmetica. These texts deal with solving algebraic equations, and have led, in number theory, to the modern notion of Diophantine equation.

Earlier traditions discussed above had a direct influence on the Persian mathematician Muḥammad ibn Mūsā al-Khwārizmī (–850). He later wrote The Compendious Book on Calculation by Completion and Balancing, which established algebra as a mathematical discipline that is independent of geometry and arithmetic.

The Hellenistic mathematicians Hero of Alexandria and Diophantus as well as Indian mathematicians such as Brahmagupta, continued the traditions of Egypt and Babylon, though Diophantus' Arithmetica and Brahmagupta's Brāhmasphuṭasiddhānta are on a higher level. For example, the first complete arithmetic solution written in words instead of symbols, including zero and negative solutions, to quadratic equations was described by Brahmagupta in his book Brahmasphutasiddhanta, published in 628 AD. Later, Persian and Arab mathematicians developed algebraic methods to a much higher degree of sophistication. Although Diophantus and the Babylonians used mostly special ad hoc methods to solve equations, Al-Khwarizmi's contribution was fundamental. He solved linear and quadratic equations without algebraic symbolism, negative numbers or zero, thus he had to distinguish several types of equations.

In the context where algebra is identified with the theory of equations, the Greek mathematician Diophantus has traditionally been known as the "father of algebra" and in the context where it is identified with rules for manipulating and solving equations, Persian mathematician al-Khwarizmi is regarded as "the father of algebra". It is open to debate whether Diophantus or al-Khwarizmi is more entitled to be known, in the general sense, as "the father of algebra". Those who support Diophantus point to the fact that the algebra found in Al-Jabr is slightly more elementary than the algebra found in Arithmetica and that Arithmetica is syncopated while Al-Jabr is fully rhetorical. Those who support Al-Khwarizmi point to the fact that he introduced the methods of "reduction" and "balancing" (the transposition of subtracted terms to the other side of an equation, that is, the cancellation of like terms on opposite sides of the equation) which the term al-jabr originally referred to, and that he gave an exhaustive explanation of solving quadratic equations, supported by geometric proofs while treating algebra as an independent discipline in its own right. His algebra was also no longer concerned "with a series of problems to be resolved, but an exposition which starts with primitive terms in which the combinations must give all possible prototypes for equations, which henceforward explicitly constitute the true object of study". He also studied an equation for its own sake and "in a generic manner, insofar as it does not simply emerge in the course of solving a problem, but is specifically called on to define an infinite class of problems".

Another Persian mathematician Omar Khayyam is credited with identifying the foundations of algebraic geometry and found the general geometric solution of the cubic equation. His book Treatise on Demonstrations of Problems of Algebra (1070), which laid down the principles of algebra, is part of the body of Persian mathematics that was eventually transmitted to Europe. Yet another Persian mathematician, Sharaf al-Dīn al-Tūsī, found algebraic and numerical solutions to various cases of cubic equations. He also developed the concept of a function. The Indian mathematicians Mahavira and Bhaskara II, the Persian mathematician Al-Karaji, and the Chinese mathematician Zhu Shijie, solved various cases of cubic, quartic, quintic and higher-order polynomial equations using numerical methods. In the 13th century, the solution of a cubic equation by Fibonacci is representative of the beginning of a revival in European algebra. Abū al-Ḥasan ibn ʿAlī al-Qalaṣādī (1412–1486) took "the first steps toward the introduction of algebraic symbolism". He also computed Σn2, Σn3 and used the method of successive approximation to determine square roots.

Modern history 

François Viète's work on new algebra at the close of the 16th century was an important step towards modern algebra. In 1637, René Descartes published La Géométrie, inventing analytic geometry and introducing modern algebraic notation. Another key event in the further development of algebra was the general algebraic solution of the cubic and quartic equations, developed in the mid-16th century. The idea of a determinant was developed by Japanese mathematician Seki Kōwa in the 17th century, followed independently by Gottfried Leibniz ten years later, for the purpose of solving systems of simultaneous linear equations using matrices. Gabriel Cramer also did some work on matrices and determinants in the 18th century. Permutations were studied by Joseph-Louis Lagrange in his 1770 paper "Réflexions sur la résolution algébrique des équations devoted to solutions of algebraic equations, in which he introduced Lagrange resolvents. Paolo Ruffini was the first person to develop the theory of permutation groups, and like his predecessors, also in the context of solving algebraic equations.

Abstract algebra was developed in the 19th century, deriving from the interest in solving equations, initially focusing on what is now called Galois theory, and on constructibility issues. George Peacock was the founder of axiomatic thinking in arithmetic and algebra. Augustus De Morgan discovered relation algebra in his Syllabus of a Proposed System of Logic. Josiah Willard Gibbs developed an algebra of vectors in three-dimensional space, and Arthur Cayley developed an algebra of matrices (this is a noncommutative algebra).

Areas of mathematics with the word algebra in their name 

Some subareas of algebra have the word algebra in their name; linear algebra is one example. Others do not: group theory, ring theory, and field theory are examples. In this section, we list some areas of mathematics with the word "algebra" in the name.

 Elementary algebra, the part of algebra that is usually taught in elementary courses of mathematics.
 Abstract algebra, in which algebraic structures such as groups, rings and fields are axiomatically defined and investigated.
 Linear algebra, in which the specific properties of linear equations, vector spaces and matrices are studied.
 Boolean algebra, a branch of algebra abstracting the computation with the truth values false and true.
 Commutative algebra, the study of commutative rings.
 Computer algebra, the implementation of algebraic methods as algorithms and computer programs.
 Homological algebra, the study of algebraic structures that are fundamental to study topological spaces.
 Universal algebra, in which properties common to all algebraic structures are studied.
 Algebraic number theory, in which the properties of numbers are studied from an algebraic point of view.
 Algebraic geometry, a branch of geometry, in its primitive form specifying curves and surfaces as solutions of polynomial equations.
 Algebraic combinatorics, in which algebraic methods are used to study combinatorial questions.
 Relational algebra: a set of finitary relations that is closed under certain operators.

Many mathematical structures are called algebras:

 Algebra over a field or more generally algebra over a ring.Many classes of algebras over a field or over a ring have a specific name:
 Associative algebra
 Non-associative algebra
 Lie algebra
 Composition algebra
 Hopf algebra
 C*-algebra
 Symmetric algebra
 Exterior algebra
 Tensor algebra
 In measure theory,
 Sigma-algebra
 Algebra over a set
 In category theory
 F-algebra and F-coalgebra
 T-algebra
 In logic,
 Relation algebra, a residuated Boolean algebra expanded with an involution called converse.
 Boolean algebra, a complemented distributive lattice.
 Heyting algebra

Elementary algebra 

Elementary algebra is the most basic form of algebra. It is taught to students who are presumed to have no knowledge of mathematics beyond the basic principles of arithmetic. In arithmetic, only numbers and their arithmetical operations (such as +, −, ×, ÷) occur. In algebra, numbers are often represented by symbols called variables (such as a, n, x, y or z). This is useful because:

 It allows the general formulation of arithmetical laws (such as a + b = b + a for all a and b), and thus is the first step to a systematic exploration of the properties of the real number system.
 It allows the reference to "unknown" numbers, the formulation of equations and the study of how to solve these. (For instance, "Find a number x such that 3x + 1 = 10" or going a bit further "Find a number x such that ax + b = c". This step leads to the conclusion that it is not the nature of the specific numbers that allow us to solve it, but that of the operations involved.)
 It allows the formulation of functional relationships. (For instance, "If you sell x tickets, then your profit will be 3x − 10 dollars, or f(x) = 3x − 10, where f is the function, and x is the number to which the function is applied".)

Polynomials 

A polynomial is an expression that is the sum of a finite number of non-zero terms, each term consisting of the product of a constant and a finite number of variables raised to whole number powers. For example, x2 + 2x − 3 is a polynomial in the single variable x. A polynomial expression is an expression that may be rewritten as a polynomial, by using commutativity, associativity and distributivity of addition and multiplication. For example, (x − 1)(x + 3) is a polynomial expression, that, properly speaking, is not a polynomial. A polynomial function is a function that is defined by a polynomial, or, equivalently, by a polynomial expression. The two preceding examples define the same polynomial function.

Two important and related problems in algebra are the factorization of polynomials, that is, expressing a given polynomial as a product of other polynomials that cannot be factored any further, and the computation of polynomial greatest common divisors. The example polynomial above can be factored as (x − 1)(x + 3). A related class of problems is finding algebraic expressions for the roots of a polynomial in a single variable.

Education 

It has been suggested that elementary algebra should be taught to students as young as eleven years old, though in recent years it is more common for public lessons to begin at the eighth grade level (≈ 13 y.o. ±) in the United States. However, in some US schools, algebra instruction starts in ninth grade.

Abstract algebra 

Abstract algebra extends the familiar concepts found in elementary algebra and arithmetic of numbers to more general concepts. Here are the listed fundamental concepts in abstract algebra.

Sets: Rather than just considering the different types of numbers, abstract algebra deals with the more general concept of sets: collections of objects called elements. All collections of the familiar types of numbers are sets. Other examples of sets include the set of all two-by-two matrices, the set of all second-degree polynomials (ax2 + bx + c), the set of all two dimensional vectors of a plane, and the various finite groups such as the cyclic groups, which are the groups of integers modulo n. Set theory is a branch of logic and not technically a branch of algebra.

Binary operations: The notion of addition (+) is generalized to the notion of binary operation (denoted here by ∗). The notion of binary operation is meaningless without the set on which the operation is defined. For two elements a and b in a set S, a ∗ b is another element in the set; this condition is called closure. Addition (+), subtraction (−), multiplication (×), and division (÷) can be binary operations when defined on different sets, as are addition and multiplication of matrices, vectors, and polynomials.

Identity elements: The numbers zero and one are generalized to give the notion of an identity element for an operation. Zero is the identity element for addition and one is the identity element for multiplication. For a general binary operator ∗ the identity element e must satisfy a ∗ e = a and e ∗ a = a, and is necessarily unique, if it exists. This holds for addition as a + 0 = a and 0 + a = a and multiplication a × 1 = a and 1 × a = a. Not all sets and operator combinations have an identity element; for example, the set of positive natural numbers (1, 2, 3, ...) has no identity element for addition.

Inverse elements: The negative numbers give rise to the concept of inverse elements. For addition, the inverse of a is written −a, and for multiplication the inverse is written a−1. A general two-sided inverse element a−1 satisfies the property that a ∗ a−1 = e and a−1 ∗ a = e, where e is the identity element.

Associativity: Addition of integers has a property called associativity. That is, the grouping of the numbers to be added does not affect the sum. For example: . In general, this becomes (a ∗ b) ∗ c = a ∗ (b ∗ c). This property is shared by most binary operations, but not subtraction or division or octonion multiplication.

Commutativity: Addition and multiplication of real numbers are both commutative. That is, the order of the numbers does not affect the result. For example: 2 + 3 = 3 + 2. In general, this becomes a ∗ b = b ∗ a. This property does not hold for all binary operations. For example, matrix multiplication and quaternion multiplication are both non-commutative.

Groups 

Combining the above concepts gives one of the most important structures in mathematics: a group. A group is a combination of a set S and a single binary operation ∗, defined in any way you choose, but with the following properties:

 An identity element e exists, such that for every member a of S, e ∗ a and a ∗ e are both identical to a.
 Every element has an inverse: for every member a of S, there exists a member a−1 such that a ∗ a−1 and a−1 ∗ a are both identical to the identity element.
 The operation is associative: if a, b and c are members of S, then (a ∗ b) ∗ c is identical to a ∗ (b ∗ c).

If a group is also commutative – that is, for any two members a and b of S, a ∗ b is identical to b ∗ a – then the group is said to be abelian.

For example, the set of integers under the operation of addition is a group. In this group, the identity element is 0 and the inverse of any element a is its negation, −a. The associativity requirement is met, because for any integers a, b and c, (a + b) + c = a + (b + c)

The non-zero rational numbers form a group under multiplication. Here, the identity element is 1, since 1 × a = a × 1 = a for any rational number a.

The integers under the multiplication operation, however, do not form a group. This is because, in general, the multiplicative inverse of an integer is not an integer.

The theory of groups is studied in group theory. A major result of this theory is the classification of finite simple groups, mostly published between about 1955 and 1983, which separates the finite simple groups into roughly 30 basic types.

Semi-groups, quasi-groups, and monoids are algebraic structures similar to groups, but with less constraints on the operation. They comprise a set and a closed binary operation but do not necessarily satisfy the other conditions. A semi-group has an associative binary operation but might not have an identity element. A monoid is a semi-group which does have an identity but might not have an inverse for every element. A quasi-group satisfies a requirement that any element can be turned into any other by either a unique left-multiplication or right-multiplication; however, the binary operation might not be associative.

All groups are monoids, and all monoids are semi-groups.

Rings and fields 

Groups just have one binary operation. To fully explain the behaviour of the different types of numbers, structures with two operators need to be studied. The most important of these are rings and fields.

A ring has two binary operations (+) and (×), with × distributive over +. Under the first operator (+) it forms an abelian group. Under the second operator (×) it is associative, but it does not need to have an identity, or inverse, so division is not required. The additive (+) identity element is written as 0 and the additive inverse of a is written as −a.

Distributivity generalises the distributive law for numbers.

The integers are an example of a ring. The integers have additional properties which make it an integral domain.

A field is a ring with the additional property that all the elements excluding 0 form an abelian group under ×. The multiplicative (×) identity is written as 1 and the multiplicative inverse of a is written as a−1.

The rational numbers, the real numbers and the complex numbers are all examples of fields.

See also 

 Algebra tile
 Outline of algebra
 Outline of linear algebra

References

Citations

Works cited

Further reading

External links 

 Khan Academy: Conceptual videos and worked examples
 Khan Academy: Origins of Algebra, free online micro lectures
 Algebrarules.com: An open source resource for learning the fundamentals of Algebra
 4000 Years of Algebra, lecture by Robin Wilson, at Gresham College, October 17, 2007 (available for MP3 and MP4 download, as well as a text file).